The 2000–01 Wessex Football League was the 15th season of the Wessex Football League. The league champions for the first time in their history were Andover. There was no promotion to the Southern League, but founder members Portsmouth Royal Navy finished bottom and were relegated.

For sponsorship reasons, the league was known as the Jewson Wessex League.

League table
The league consisted of one division of 23 clubs, increased from 21 the previous season, after East Cowes Victoria Athletic were relegated and three new clubs joined:
Blackfield & Langley, joining from the Hampshire League.
Fleet Town, relegated from the Southern Football League.
Swanage Town & Herston, rejoining from the Dorset Combination League after being relegated in 1996.

References

Wessex Football League seasons
8